Zamir Shpuza (26 June 1968 – 10 January 2014) was an Albanian international football player and coach.

Club career
Born and raised in a traditional family from Shkodër, Shpuza was noticed on the U19 team of KF Vllaznia Shkodër, debuting for the senior squad in the season 1988–89. At that time Albania was still ruled by a communist regime, and in a secret meeting of the local communist party committee, Zamir was playing for Vllaznia U17 team, were expelled from the team as party enemies because their uncles were considered undesired by the party. Their uncle was caught illegally crossing the border and then labeled as "traitor". Nicknamed Tutoja, Zamir and his brother didn't give up football, and joined Veleçiku from Koplik. Soon after, democratic transition began in Albania, and Zamir and Luan joined democratic and anti-communist moviments in Shkodër. They joined the Democratic Party. Coaches Astrit Hafizi and Neptun Bajko took Zamir to the capital to join Albanian giants FK Partizani Tirana. He had the opportunity to show his exceptional talent there, and was rewarded with first calls to Albanian national U21 and Olympic teams.

In 1991 he moved to the Yugoslav side Budućnost Titograd along his compatriot Ramiz Bisha. He played in the 1991–92 Yugoslav First League. and became known as "Albanian Belodedici". In 1992 he returned to Albania, joining KF Vllaznia Shkodër and winning the Albanian championship in 1992. In 1994, he moved to Speyer, Germany, asking for asylum, where is a large Albanian community. There he joined local side FV Speyer. In the 1995–96 season he played with 2. Bundesliga side SV Waldhof Mannheim but failed to make any league appearance. In 1996 he joined Viktoria Griesheim. Between 2000 and 2007 he was a player-coach of FV Speyer.

International career
He played for Albanian national U21 and Olympic teams before debuting for the main team in 1991. He made his senior debut for Albania in a May 1991 European Championship qualification match against Czechoslovakia and earned a total of 5 caps, scoring no goals. His final international was a June 1997 FIFA World Cup qualification match against Portugal.

Personal life
Shpuza died in Germany in January 2014 from sudden brain hemorrhage. He had a wife and two children.

Honours
Vllaznia
Albanian Superliga: 1
 1992

References

External links

1968 births
2014 deaths
Footballers from Shkodër
Albanian footballers
Albania international footballers
Albania under-21 international footballers
Association football defenders
KF Vllaznia Shkodër players
KS Veleçiku Koplik players
FK Partizani Tirana players
FK Budućnost Podgorica players
FV Speyer players
SV Waldhof Mannheim players
Kategoria Superiore players
Kategoria e Parë players
Yugoslav First League players
Albanian expatriate footballers
Expatriate footballers in Yugoslavia
Albanian expatriate sportspeople in Yugoslavia
Expatriate footballers in Germany
Albanian expatriate sportspeople in Germany
Albanian football managers
Albanian expatriate football managers
Expatriate football managers in Germany